Santiago Castaño (born April 14, 1995) is an American professional soccer player who played as a goalkeeper.

Career

Professional
Santiago Castaño joined the Red Bulls Academy in September 2008 and played for New York's U-14, U-15, U-16, and U-18 teams. He trained with the first team as an academy player before signing his first professional contract in 2012. During his first two years with the club he served as the team's third goalkeeper.

Castaño made his professional debut at the age of 19 playing for New York Red Bulls II, the affiliate of his team, on March 28, 2015, in a 0–0 draw against Rochester Rhinos.  Castaño was named to the USL Team of the Week for his performance for NYRBII on August 22, 2015, in a 2–0 victory over Toronto FC II, a match in which he made six saves and recorded his fourth clean sheet of the season. Castaño was released by New York on January 25, 2016.

After leaving Red Bulls, Castaño left for Colombia, joining Socrates Valencia F.C in the Colombian Third Division. On December 7, 2017, he scored from the penalty spot to help his club to a 2–1 victory over Fantasías Nueva York in the Copa Ciudad Pereira. He scored three goals (penalty kicks) with the club during the 2017 season.

For the 2017–18 season he was on the roster of TSF FC of the National Premier Soccer League.

On January 28, 2019, Castaño joined the New York Cosmos for the 2019 season.

International
Castaño has represented the United States at various youth levels, in 2014 he appeared in 4 matches for the United States men's national under-20 soccer team.

In December 2014 he accepted a call to join the Colombia national under-20 football team camp.

References

1995 births
Living people
American soccer players
New York Red Bulls players
New York Red Bulls II players
New York Cosmos B players
New York Cosmos (2010) players
Association football goalkeepers
United States men's under-20 international soccer players
American expatriate sportspeople in Colombia
American sportspeople of Colombian descent
Expatriate footballers in Colombia
American expatriate soccer players
Sportspeople from Queens, New York
Soccer players from New York City
Homegrown Players (MLS)
Deportivo Pereira footballers